The Kingcome River is a river in the Canadian province of British Columbia.

Course
The Kingcome River flows generally south into Kingcome Inlet, which lies north of and on the inland side of the Broughton Archipelago.

See also
List of British Columbia rivers
Kingcome (disambiguation)

References

Rivers of the Central Coast of British Columbia
Rivers of the Pacific Ranges